Laerskool Raslouw and Hoërskool Raslouw exists for the reason that a school should exist: to educate pupils. Academic responsibility and relevance is crucial, and is purposefully combined with the necessary sport and cultural activities that forms a comprehensive education inside and outside the classroom to empower a pupil for the future. The school use and participate in the contemporary learning materials of indicato.

It is a suite of private confessional Christian schools with a drive for education suited to the information age, and the world of the 21st century. The Bible is the Word of God, and confessionally the schools refer to the three confessional tracts of the Synod of Dordrecht (1618/19) and this basis encourages education to be relevant to educate and train pupils to be able to preserve, develop and utilise the creation of God to the best of the wonderful ability that God has given to man. From 2014 the schools are located on its own premises in Raslouw, Centurion, Gauteng, South Africa.

The schools are Afrikaans in language and culture, and pupils enjoy the benefits of being schooled in a triangle of home, church and school that strives to be in unison.

The schools

The primary school started in January 2000 and grew from two teachers and six pupils to a fully-fledged set of schools from 3 year olds to Grade 12.

The school went up to Grade 12 (matric) in 2011, but the lack of suitable infrastructure showed that the high school could not fully provide for the needs of the 21st century pupil, where academic, sport and cultural participation and pride requires facilities more than what were available in the small classrooms rented at churches. Academically the high school's ability to successfully teach CIE was proven, with the three matric pupils of 2011 currently successfully studying at three different universities in South Africa, and boasting numerous distinctions in their AS examination achievements.

After 10 years of existence as a parent owned mutual school, the school was bought out in 2010 by indicato inligting (Edms) Bpk in which two families with children in the school were involved. The schools are owned and operated by Raslouw Onderwys (Edms) Bpk which is a full subsidiary of indicato. The current managing director, Leonard van der Dussen was a founder member of the school since its earliest planning.

The school obtained its own land in September 2013 and operates on this site since January 2014. One of the first permanent developments on this 2,6ha property in Raslouw, Centurion, South Africa, was the sports field. The specific land parcel is well placed close to major routes, just off the main road, and is a rectangular site that can be fully utilised. Existing trees are being preserved where possible, and the land has the qualities of space and natural Bosveld feel with which the South African child identifies.

The school consists of three divisions:

 Raslouw Pre-primêr (Pre-primary)  -  a toddler class for 3 - 5 year olds, and a Grade 0 (preparatory for primary school) class for 6 year olds.
 
 Laerskool Raslouw (Primary School Raslouw) - Grades 1 - 7 (junior and secondary primary phases of three years each, with Grade 7 transitional to high school)
 
 Hoërskool Raslouw (High School Raslouw)  - Grade 8 to 12 (Cambridge IGCSE and AS Levels)

These schools use the indicato curriculum up to Grade 7, and from thereon IGCSE and AS Levels of the Cambridge International Examinations (CIE).

The schools are Afrikaans language based, with strong emphasis on English as second language skills in a globalised world.

Sport participation is encouraged, with athletics, rugby, netball, hockey, cricket and tennis as well as team chess, skululu and archery. General fitness is encouraged, and a biokinetics programme is part of the formal morning roster.

The school has a full-time music teacher, and employs part-time specialists for individual music lessons (e g piano) and a junior and senior choir.

The aim is to provide a full and complete schooling experience to educate and prepare pupils for life in its broad spectrum.

Administrative Information

The schools of Raslouw Onderwys (Edms) Bpk are dynamic: it takes cognisance of the community in which it operates, but follow independent thinking and in conjunction with its owners, indicato, is gradually reshaping education habits in South Africa to meet 21st century requirements.

The schools has care facilities for the afternoon outside the official morning based programme, and numerous sport and cultural activities.

The administrative details, such as school terms, daily school times, fees and the like are available on the schools' website.

See also
University of Cambridge International Examinations
Centurion

External links
http://www.raslouwskool.co.za/ School Homepage (Afrikaans)

Private schools in Gauteng
Afrikaans-language schools
Cambridge schools in South Africa
City of Tshwane Metropolitan Municipality